Charles Reiff Nyce (born Charles Reiff Nice) (July 1, 1870 – May 9, 1908) was a professional baseball player. He played in nine games in Major League Baseball for the Boston Beaneaters of the National League during the 1895 season as a shortstop.

Prior to his major league stint, he played from 1892-94 in the Pennsylvania State League and after he left the Beaneaters, he played from 1895–1900 in the minors, with stops in the New England League, Western League, Eastern League, Atlantic League and Connecticut State League.

References

External links

Major League Baseball shortstops
Boston Beaneaters players
Allentown-Bethlehem Colts players
Allentown Colts players
Pottsville Colts players
New Bedford Whalers (baseball) players
Kansas City Blues (baseball) players
St. Paul Saints (Western League) players
Detroit Tigers (Western League) players
Providence Clamdiggers (baseball) players
Wilkes-Barre Coal Barons players
New London Whalers players
Baseball players from Pennsylvania
19th-century baseball players
1870 births
1908 deaths